Lobosh Buttress is the ice-covered buttress rising to 1188 m in the southeast foothills of Detroit Plateau on southern Trinity Peninsula in Graham Land, Antarctica, east of the upper course of Boydell Glacier.  The feature has precipitous, mostly ice-free west slopes, and surmounts Boydell Glacier to the west and south.

The peak is named after the settlement of Lobosh in Western Bulgaria.

Location

Maps
 Antarctic Digital Database (ADD). Scale 1:250000 topographic map of Antarctica. Scientific Committee on Antarctic Research (SCAR), 1993–2016.

Notes

References
 Lobosh Peak. SCAR Composite Antarctic Gazetteer.
 Bulgarian Antarctic Gazetteer. Antarctic Place-names Commission. (details in Bulgarian, basic data in English)

External links
 Lobosh Buttress. Copernix satellite image

Mountains of Trinity Peninsula
Bulgaria and the Antarctic